Keohohiwa (fl. 19th century) was a Hawaiian chiefess during the formation of the Kingdom of Hawaii.

Life
Her father was Keawe-a-Heulu, the chief warrior and councillor of Kamehameha I, who assisted him to overthrow his cousin Kiwalao and unite the eight separate islands of Hawaii into one Kingdom of Hawaii.  Her mother was Ululani, the alii of Hilo and the most celebrated poet of her days.

Her brother was Naihe, the councillor and chief orator of Kamehameha I and husband of Chiefess Kapiolani (c. 1781–1841) who helped Christian missionaries by renouncing the goddess Pele.

Keohohiwa married Chief Kepookalani, son of Kameʻeiamoku, one of the royal twins. She had one son Aikanaka from her husband. Through her son she was great-grandmother of Kalākaua and Queen Liliuokalani.

References

Royalty of the Hawaiian Kingdom
House of Kalākaua
Year of birth unknown
Year of death unknown